Karzzzz is a 2008 Indian Hindi-language action film directed by Satish Kaushik. It stars Urmila Matondkar and Himesh Reshammiya. It is a remake of Karz (1980) and also inspired by The Reincarnation of Peter Proud.

Plot
Ravi Verma has just won a court case against gangster Sir Judah in Kenya, making him the legal recipient of several thousand acres of vineyards. He celebrates the victory by marrying the love of his life, Kamini, and decides to introduce her to his mother and sister. Unbeknownst to Ravi, Kamini is in cahoots with Judah; she sabotages the plane they are travelling in, and safely escapes, leaving Ravi with no parachute. He quickly falls to his death. Kamini, now Princess Kamini, inherits Ravi’s wealth, forcing his mother and sister to live in abject poverty. 

Flash forward to 25 years later, we are introduced to Monty, the adopted son of J.J. Oberoi, and a well-known musician and rock star in Cape Town, South Africa. He has everything at his disposal, but feels unhappy. He drives joy from spending time with Tina, the girl he’s romantically interested in, and Dr. Dayal, his friend, and close confidante. Monty starts getting flashbacks of events from Ravi's life, and plans to trip to Kenya to understand why. Once there, he meets Tina's caretaker Kabira appears to be happy about Tina and Monty being together.

Eventually, Monty realises that he is actually the reincarnation of Ravi. After complete recollection of events surrounding his accident, Monty sets out to find his/Ravi’s mother and sister. He befriends Princess Kamini, who incidentally knows Tina as well. She’s now Judah’s mistress, and the heiress to Ravi’s property. Monty tells her about the reincarnation, but insists he doesn’t remember how he/Ravi died. She proceeds to mislead him about the circumstances of the accident, and lies that his/Ravi’s mother and sister are deceased. Later, Monty discovers that they have been living with his/Ravi’s nephew and niece this entire time. He hatches a plan with Tina and Kabira to bring Princess Kamini to justice. 

Monty convinces Princess Kamini to marry him. He furnishes the actual papers of Ravi’s properties in an attempt to persuade her, and it works. They get married on stage at Monty’s show. During the performance, he reenacts the accident to make Princess Kamini believe that he remembers she killed him/Ravi. Following a showdown between Monty and her, she confesses, albeit in anger, to Ravi’s murder. 

Monty brings in his/Ravi’s mother and sister (accompanied by her kids) and warns Princess Kamini that they will get their dues. In the meantime, Kabira appears with the police in tow, who have her confession on record. Suddenly, Judah comes along holding Tina hostage and demands Princes Kamini’s release. A fight ensues, with Kabira tackling Judah and rescuing Tina. Princess Kamini tries to runs away, with Monty at her heels. They arrive at the same spot where Ravi was killed in his previous birth, as she boards a plane and shoots Monty. During the hullabaloo, Monty's car overturns with fuel leakage. As Princess Kamini's plane approaches him, Monty sets the car on fire that soon engulfs the plane. With Princess Kamini dead, Monty and Tina are united as the end credits roll.

Cast
Urmila Matondkar as Kamini Verma, Ravi Verma's wife
Himesh Reshammiya as Monty Oberoi; Reincarnation of Ravi Shanta Prasad Verma 
Dino Morea as Ravi Shanta Prasad Verma (Shanta's son, Jyoti's brother and Kamini Devi's husband) (special appearance)
Raj Babbar as J.J. Oberoi (Monty's Guardian; Music Producer)
Smita Bansal as Jyoti Shanta Parasad Verma 'aka' Pinky, Shanta's daughter and Ravi's sister
Shweta Kumar as Tina
Imran Hasnee as Mahesh; Tina's dad
Shiva Rindani as Sir Judah's man
Danny Denzongpa as Kabira (Kabir Uncle/"Kabir Chacha")
Rohini Hattangadi as Mrs. Shanta Prasad Verma, Ravi and Jyoti's mother
Gulshan Grover as Sir Judah, A Left-Handed Robot-boss of Kamini Devi
Bakhtiyaar Irani as Dr. Dayal, Monty's friend
Himani Shivpuri as Mrs. Neha Oberoi, G. G. Oberoi's wife
Tareena Patel as Julie (special appearance)
David Hallart as dancer, background actor
Asrani as College Principal Mr. Joe D'Souza
Sudhir Dalvi as Dr. Shastri, Dr. Dayal's Senior
Sudhir Pandey as John
Raashi Khanna
Chiranjeevi
Dinesh Lamba as Kabira's sidekick
Jenny Freeman
Daniel Green
Sujeet Kumar Sharma

Production
The film was flagged on 25 January 2008. Filming took place in Mumbai, India and in South Africa. Reshammiya performed his own stunts. On 16 February 2008, Reshammiya had given a live performance in South Africa of the two ultimate dance numbers namely "Sisak Sisak Ke" and "Hari Om". The sound recording was entirely done in Singapore. Reshammiya performed his songs "Lut Jaaon" and "Ek Haseena Thi" at Sa Re Ga Ma Pa Challenge 2009's first show.

Reception
Taran Adarsh of Bollywood Hungama gave Karzzzz 4 stars out of 5 claiming it to be a "Mass entertainer" and further saying that "Karzzzz is rich in entertainment. Himesh's tremendous popularity amongst masses, its chartbusting musical score and the fact that it's a remake of a much-loved film will only lure masses in hordes. Besides, it's an open ground for Karzzzz at the ticket window, what with the euphoria of all past releases having dried up. At the box-office, the film should fetch a thunderous start and in due course, should be amongst the biggest achievers of the year in terms of business, Critics praised Urimilla performance in the film ." Rajeev Masand of CNN-IBN gave the film one star and said "It's a lazy rip-off where everything from characters to dialogues has been more-or-less duplicated, the only changes being superficial ones which grate rather than update."

Soundtrack
Himesh Reshammiya composed the film's music while Sameer penned the lyrics. The song "Ek Haseena Thi" is taken from the original movie of 1980, Karz, whose music was by Laxmikant Pyarelal. According to the Indian trade website Box Office India, with around 1,300,000 units sold, this film's soundtrack album was the year's eleventh highest-selling.

Awards and nominations

References

External links
 
 

2008 films
2000s Hindi-language films
Indian action films
Films about reincarnation
Remakes of Indian films
Films scored by Himesh Reshammiya
Reliance Entertainment films
Indian films about revenge
Films directed by Satish Kaushik